The Canadian oil tanker Canadolite was an 11,309 grt. tanker. She was built in 1926 and launched later that year. She was owned by the Imperial Oil company and was built in Germany. On March 25, 1941, she was captured by the  German auxiliary cruiser Kormoran and was subsequently turned into a German tanker. She survived until 1944 when she was sunk in Brest by RAF aircraft.  Her original crew was saved and captured, however they were sent to a German internment camp.

References

Oil tankers
World War II tankers
Captured ships
Ships sunk by British aircraft
Merchant ships sunk by aircraft